Anoplodesmus sabulosus, is a species of millipedes in the family Paradoxosomatidae. It is endemic to Sri Lanka, which was first documented from Kandy.

References

Polydesmida
Animals described in 1898
Endemic fauna of Sri Lanka
Millipedes of Asia